Khodeza Nasreen Akhter Hossain is a Bangladesh Awami League politician and a Member of the Bangladesh Parliament from a reserved seat.

Career
Hossain was burned after the bus she was in was attacked by Bangladesh Nationalist Party activists during a strike in 2013.

Hossain was elected to parliament from reserved seat as a Bangladesh Awami League candidate in 2019. She is a member of the parliamentary caucus on child rights.

References

Awami League politicians
Living people
Women members of the Jatiya Sangsad
11th Jatiya Sangsad members
21st-century Bangladeshi women politicians
21st-century Bangladeshi politicians
1968 births